Jan "Julle" Berg (11 May 1943 – 14 August 2005) was a Norwegian footballer.

He played his entire career for his hometown team FK Lyn, and won the Norwegian First Division in 1964 and 1968 as well as the Norwegian Football Cup in 1967 and 1968.

He played 190 matches and scored 57 goals for Lyn from 1960 to 1971, including six matches in 1968–69 European Cup Winners' Cup where Lyn reached the quarter-final.

After his retirement, Berg was the head coach of Lyn from 1977 to 1978. Jan Berg is the brother of Axel Berg

References

1943 births
2005 deaths
Norwegian footballers
Eliteserien players
Lyn Fotball players
Lyn Fotball managers
Association football midfielders
Norwegian football managers
Footballers from Oslo